Kwan Sai Hung is a fictional martial artist, and the subject of the books Chronicles of Tao. Born in 1920, Kwan is a Taoist Monk from the Zheng Yi sect of Taoism from the Huashan monastery.  He is also a martial arts master.

References 

Fictional martial artists